Kumbhawade is a small village in Sindhudurg district near Amboli hill resort in India. Kumbhawade is well-known its mango, cashew and banana farms.

Nearby villages
Nearby villages include Chaukul.

People 
The majority of the population is composed of ethnic Marathas. The population also includes Dalits.

Common Surnames 
Surnames of the people include Gawade, Parab, Naik, Shetye, and sawant

External links
  Google Map

Villages in Sindhudurg district